Firuz Kola-ye Sofla (also Romanized as Fīrūz Kolā-ye Soflá; also known as Fīrūz Kolā-ye Pā’īn) is a village in Tavabe-e Kojur Rural District, Kojur District, Nowshahr County, Mazandaran Province, Iran. At the 2006 census, its population was 283, in 84 families.

References 

Populated places in Nowshahr County